This articles lists events from the year 2022 in Oman.

Incumbents

Events 

 22 May - Oman announces that it will repeal all COVID-19 restrictions, including its mask mandate.

Sports 

 21 - 28 January: 2022 Women's Hockey Asia Cup
 10 - 15 February: 2022 Tour of Oman
 9 - 18 August: Oman at the 2021 Islamic Solidarity Games

References 

 
2020s in Oman
Years of the 21st century in Oman
Oman
Oman